Songnae Station is a station on Seoul Subway Line 1. It is an above-ground station located in the city of Bucheon, South Korea. It provides access to many restaurants and other services, including the Toona Shopping Center.

References

External links
 Station information from Korail

Seoul Metropolitan Subway stations
Metro stations in Bucheon
Railway stations opened in 1974